Lifetime is a Canadian English language specialty channel owned by Showcase Television Inc., a subsidiary of Corus Entertainment. Based on the U.S. cable network of the same name, Lifetime broadcasts films, television series, and reality series aimed at women.

The channel was launched on September 7, 2001 as Showcase Diva as an digital offshoot of Showcase by Alliance Atlantis focusing on films targeting a female audience. After a series of ownership changes, the channel was relaunched into its current name in 2012 with the Lifetime branding licensed by A&E Networks.

History

In November 2000, Alliance Atlantis (via the Showcase Television subsidiary) was granted approval by the Canadian Radio-television and Telecommunications Commission (CRTC) to launch a television channel called Romance Television, described as "a national English-language Category 2 specialty television service devoted to romance. Programming will include relationship- themed game shows and magazine style programs featuring romantic vacation resorts. Other programs will explore romantic moments in people's lives, as well as classic romantic feature films, epic mini-series and made-for-television movies."

The channel was launched on September 7, 2001 as Showcase Diva, a spin-off of Showcase. Programming consisted of primarily television dramas and films.

On January 18, 2008, Canwest Global acquired control of Showcase Diva through its purchase of Alliance Atlantis' broadcasting assets, which were placed in a trust in August 2007.
On October 27, 2010, ownership changed again as Shaw Communications gained control of Showcase Diva as a result of its acquisition of Canwest and Goldman Sachs' interest in CW Media.

On May 30, 2012, it was announced that Showcase Diva would be rebranded as a Canadian version of Lifetime on August 27, 2012, through a brand licensing agreement with the U.S. channel's parent company A&E Networks. The rebrand would result in the addition of more reality series, talk shows and other original series from Lifetime to the channel's films and television dramas.

An HD feed was launched on May 29, 2013, along with the never-before-seen HD feeds for H2, Slice, and the DHX-owned Disney Junior service (now known as Family Jr.).

In February 2022, Lifetime was added to streaming bundle StackTV. It was later added in February 2023 to the Global TV app along with the Canadian version of the Magnolia Network.

See also
 List of Canadian specialty channels

References

External links

Television channels and stations established in 2001
2001 establishments in Canada
A&E Networks
Corus Entertainment networks
Digital cable television networks in Canada
Women's interest channels
English-language television stations in Canada